Anna Malikova (born 14 July 1965) is a Russian pianist.

Life
Malikova was born in Tashkent, Uzbekistan, where she received her first musical education with Tamara A. Popovich at Uspensky Music School. At the age of 14 years she entered Central Music School in Moscow in the class of Lev Naumov. Later, she continued her studies with Naumov at Tchaikovsky Conservatory. After her graduation she taught at the conservatory as Naumov's assistant from 1992 until 1996.
Her career started afterwards, first in the Soviet Union. Today she lives in Vienna/Austria

Performances
She played recitals in Moscow, Leningrad, Omsk, Baku and with orchestras in Ekaterinburg, Minsk, Nizhny Novgorod, Kazan and Tashkent. After winning the 1st Prize at ARD Competition Munich she began to perform worldwide. Today she plays in recitals and with orchestra, gives master classes and judges in competitions in Armenia, China, Europe, Japan, Korea, and South America.
From 2002 until 2005 she was substitute professor at Folkwang University in Essen, Germany, and from 2011 until 2013 visiting professor at Szymanowski Academy in Katowice, Poland. In October 2018 Anna Malikova was appointed distinguished professor at the University of Music and Performing Arts Vienna.

Awards and competitions
1988 Oslo, Crown Princess Sonja International Music Competition, 5th Prize
1990 Warsaw, XII International Chopin Piano Competition, 5th Prize
1992 Sydney, International Piano Competition of Australia, 5th Prize
1993 Munich, ARD International Music Competition, 1st Prize
2006 Classical Internet Awards, Camille Saint-Saëns, Piano Concertos III & V

Recordings
Classical Records
Frederic Chopin, Mazurkas, Ballads, Walzes, Andante Spianato
Frederic Chopin, the two piano concertos; Orchestra Filarmonica di Torino, Julian Kovatchev
Frederic Chopin, integral Préludes and Impromptus
Frederic Chopin, integral Etudesop. 10, op. 25, op. posth.
Franz Schubert, sonata A major D 664, sonata B flat major D 960
Franz Schubert, Lieder-Arrangements by Franz Liszt
Dmitri Schostakowitsch, Préludes op. 28, Phantastic Dances, Puppet Dances
Padre Antonio Soler, 19 selected sonatas
Sergei Prokofiev, Sarcasmen op. 17, Visions fugitives op. 22, Romeo & Julia op. 75
Camille Saint-Saëns, complete piano concertos 1- 5, WDR Sinfonieorchester Köln, conducted by Thomas Sanderling. 2 SACD Audite 2010

Audite Musikproduktion
Camille Saint-Saëns, integral piano concertos I – V (Doppel-CD); WDR Radio-Symphony Orchestra Cologne, con. Thomas Sanderling

Farao Classics
Peter Tchaikowsky, Ballet Suites Sleeping Beauty and Nutcracker, Children's Album

ACOUSENCE
Johannes Brahms, piano concerto no. 2; Duisburg Philharmonic, con. Jonathan Darlington
Alexander Scriabin, integral piano sonatas I – X
Robert Schumann & Dmitri Shostakovich, the piano quintets; with Belenus Quartet

References

External links

1965 births
Living people
Uzbekistani classical pianists
Moscow Conservatory alumni
Musicians from Tashkent
20th-century classical musicians
21st-century classical musicians
21st-century classical pianists
Women classical pianists
Academic staff of the Folkwang University of the Arts
Academic staff of the University of Music and Performing Arts Vienna